Two human polls made up the 2007–08 NCAA Division I men's ice hockey rankings, the USCHO.com/CSTV Division I Men's Poll and the USA TODAY/USA Hockey Magazine Poll. As the 2007–08 season progressed, rankings were updated weekly. There were a total of 34 voters in the USA Today poll and 50 voters in the USCHO.com poll. Each first place vote in the USA Today poll is worth 15 points in the rankings while a first place vote in the USCHO.com poll is worth 20 points with every subsequent vote worth 1 fewer point in either poll.

Legend

USA Today/USA Hockey Magazine

USCHO.com

References

External links
USA Today/American Hockey Magazine Men's College Hockey Poll
USCHO.com Division I Men's Poll

Rankings
College men's ice hockey rankings in the United States